Albert Ramos-Viñolas was the defending champion but chose not to participate.

Federico Gaio won the title after defeating Constant Lestienne 6–2, 1–6, 6–3 in the final.

Seeds

Draw

Finals

Top half

Bottom half

References
Main Draw
Qualifying Draw

San Benedetto Tennis Cup - Singles
San Benedetto Tennis Cup